Coreocalamobius parantennatus is a species of beetle in the family Cerambycidae, and the only species in the genus Coreocalamobius. It was described by Hasegawa, Han and Oh in 2014.

References 

Agapanthiini
Beetles described in 2014
Monotypic Cerambycidae genera